Thomas Yates may refer to:

 Thomas J. Yates (1870–1958), seminary teacher in The Church of Jesus Christ of Latter-day Saints
 Tom Yates (1896–1978), British trade unionist
 Thomas L. Yates (fl. 1820), politician in Jamaica

See also
 Thomas Yate (1604–1681), Principal of Brasenose College, Oxford
 Thomas Yeates (born 1955), American comic book and comic strip artist
 Thomas Yeates (orientalist) (1768–1839), oriental linguist